Benjamin Bridges Hunter Rodwell QC (17 January 1815 – 6 February 1892) was a British lawyer and Conservative politician who sat in the House of Commons from 1874 to 1881.

Rodwell was the son of William Rodwell, an Ipswich banker, and his wife Elizabeth Anne Hunter, daughter of Benjamin Hunter of Glencarse, Perthshire. Benjamin Rodwell was educated at Charterhouse School and Trinity College, Cambridge, before being admitted at Inner Temple and called to the bar at Middle Temple in 1840. He served on the South-Eastern Circuit. In 1858, he became a Queen's Counsel and Bencher of his Inn. He was a J.P. and Deputy Lieutenant of Suffolk and Chairman of the quarter sessions.
 
Rodwell was elected as a Member of Parliament for Cambridgeshire in 1874, was reelected in 1879 and resigned in 1881. He was married to Mary Packer Boggis, daughter of James Boggis, in 1844. Rodwell died at his residence, Woodlands, in Holbrook, at the age of 77. His son, William, was a cricketer and barrister.

References

External links

1815 births
1892 deaths
Conservative Party (UK) MPs for English constituencies
UK MPs 1874–1880
UK MPs 1880–1885
People educated at Charterhouse School
Alumni of Trinity College, Cambridge
Deputy Lieutenants of Suffolk
Members of the Middle Temple